"From the D 2 the LBC" is a song by American rappers Eminem and Snoop Dogg. It was released on June 24, 2022, as the second single from Eminem's second greatest hits album, Curtain Call 2 (2022). The song was produced by Eminem and was written by Snoop Dogg, Eminem, and Luis Resto. It marks the first collaboration between the two rappers in over 20 years, having last appeared together on the track "Bitch Please II" from The Marshall Mathers LP (2000).

Background and promotion
A brief feud between Snoop Dogg and Eminem was sparked in July 2020 after Snoop appeared on The Breakfast Club and insinuated that Eminem's success was solely because of Eminem's mentor, Dr. Dre. In response, Eminem took jabs at Snoop on the song "Zeus" from his album Music to Be Murdered By – Side B in December 2020. In January 2021, Snoop Dogg responded to Eminem's comments on Instagram, writing, "Pray I don't answer that soft ass shit." 

In October 2021, Snoop stated that he and Eminem had ended the feud, with Snoop admitting he now felt that his original remarks were "out of pocket". The two performed together at the Super Bowl LVI halftime show in February 2022.

On June 24, 2022, Eminem released a tweet promoting the single and its accompanying video. The post included the single's cover art, which depicts the two rappers as cartoon monkeys in a comic book style, a reference to their connection to the Bored Ape NFT collection.

Music video
The music video for "From the D 2 the LBC" was released alongside the single. Directed by James Larese, the video alternates between live-action shots of Eminem and Snoop Dogg and an animated video that shows the rappers imagined as NFT-esque avatars in a comic book.

Live performances
On the day of the single's release, Eminem and Snoop Dogg performed the song live at ApeFest, a festival held in New York for Bored Ape NFT holders. On August 28, 2022, they performed the song live at the 2022 MTV Video Music Awards in Newark, New Jersey.

Charts

Release history

References

2022 songs
2022 singles
Eminem songs
Snoop Dogg songs
Songs written by Eminem
Songs written by Snoop Dogg
Songs written by Luis Resto (musician)
Song recordings produced by Eminem
Aftermath Entertainment singles
Shady Records singles
Interscope Records singles
Animated music videos
Apes in popular culture